Calomeria is a plant genus in the family Asteraceae.

 Accepted species
 Calomeria africana (S.Moore) Heine - Mozambique
 Calomeria amaranthoides Vent. - New South Wales and Victoria in Australia

 formerly included
several species now in other genera, including  Basedowia, Cassinia, Helichrysum, Humeocline and Thiseltonia.

Description 
Calomeria amaranthoides is a tall, fragrant biennial herb, growing to 3.5 metres in height. It has sticky stems and leaves which are green above and whitish beneath and are up to 15 cm long and 5 cm wide. Its flowers appear in large brown to red plumes in the summer (January to April in its native range).

Taxonomy 
The genus was first formally described by E.P. Ventenat in Jardin de la Malmaison in 1804.

References 

Gnaphalieae
Asteraceae genera